Betão Ronca Ferro is a 1970 Brazilian comedy film directed by Mazzaropi and Geraldo Afonso Miranda.

Cast
Mazzaropi - Betão
Dilma Lóes
Roberto Pirillo
Geny Prado
Araken Saldanha
Tony Vieira
Diná Lisboa
Cláudio Roberto Mecchi
Gilmara Sanches
Milton Pereira
Yaratan Lauretta
Carlos Garcia
Henricão
Judith Barbosa
Rogério Câmara

External links
 

1970 films
Brazilian comedy films
1970s Portuguese-language films
1970 comedy films